Gladys Thompson (born 6 April 1983) is a Liberian sprinter. She competed in the women's 200 metres at the 2004 Summer Olympics.

References

External links
 

1983 births
Living people
Athletes (track and field) at the 2004 Summer Olympics
Liberian female sprinters
Olympic athletes of Liberia
Place of birth missing (living people)
Olympic female sprinters